The White House Plumbers, sometimes simply called the Plumbers, the Room 16 Project, or more officially, the White House Special Investigations Unit, was a covert White House Special Investigations Unit, established within a week after the publication of the Pentagon Papers in June 1971, during the presidency of Richard Nixon. Its task was to stop and/or respond to the leaking of classified information, such as the Pentagon Papers, to the news media. The work of the unit "tapered off" after the bungled "Ellsberg break-in" but some of its former operatives branched into illegal activities while still employed at the White House together with managers of the Committee to Re-elect the President, including the Watergate break-in and the ensuing Watergate scandal. The group has been described as Nixon's "fixers".

Name
On Thanksgiving, 1971, David Young arrived home from his planning at the Special Investigative Unit, when his grandmother asked him, "What do you do at the White House?" He replied, "I am helping the president stop some leaks." She exclaimed, "Oh, you're a plumber!" Young, E. Howard Hunt, and G. Gordon Liddy then put up a sign on their office with the title "The Plumbers", but it was taken down as their operations were intended to be top secret. Still, the name stuck for the group.

Members
The Plumbers came to include several Watergate figures including Frank Sturgis. Hunt was recommended by Charles Colson, and Liddy was recommended by Egil Krogh. Liddy coined his own sensitivity indicator for the group in the form of "ODESSA".

Some authors believe Central Intelligence Agency (CIA) officer John Paisley was a member of the Plumbers. Paisley was assigned to the CIA's Office of Security, of which Nixon campaign security coordinator and Watergate burglar James McCord was once a member. On August 9, 1971, Young's memo indicates he met with Paisley and OS Director Howard Osborn, in which Paisley provided a list of objectives for the Special Investigations Unit.

Operations
The Plumbers' first task was the burglary of the office of Daniel Ellsberg's Los Angeles psychiatrist, Lewis J. Fielding, in an effort to uncover evidence to discredit Ellsberg, who had leaked the Pentagon Papers. The operation was reportedly unsuccessful in finding Ellsberg's file and was thus reported to the White House. However, Fielding himself stated the file was in his office; he found it on the floor on the morning after the burglary and quite clearly, someone had gone through it. In a September 1971 conversation, John Ehrlichman advised Nixon, "We had one little operation; it's been aborted out in Los Angeles which, I think, is better that you don't know about." Eventually, the case against Ellsberg was dismissed due to government misconduct.

Aside from the Fielding burglary, there are few other activities the Plumbers were known to have been engaged in. Hunt reportedly looked into the Ted Kennedy-Chappaquiddick incident; and Liddy reported the alleged involvement of the Kennedy administration in the assassination of South Vietnamese president Ngo Dinh Diem.

After the California break-in, Liddy—who was general counsel, a member of the finance committee of the Committee to Re-elect the President (CRP) and promoted from aide to Krogh and Young—worked with Campaign political-intelligence operations. Ehrlichman, the Assistant to the President for Domestic Affairs and Special Investigations Unit, knew about Liddy's goal to perform an intelligence-gathering operation for the CRP. Liddy involved Hunt in the operations which would later include the Watergate burglary.

Notes

References

External links
The Watergate Files presented by The Gerald R. Ford Museum & Library
G. Gordon Liddy deposition in Maureen K. Dean and John W. Dean v. St. Martin's Press et al., United States District Court for the District  of Columbia. Case No. 92 1807 (HHG), December 6, 1996.

Federal Bureau of Investigation misconduct
Watergate scandal
White House